Edward Arthur Donald St George Hamilton Chichester, 6th Marquess of Donegall (7 October 1903 – 24 May 1975), was a British peer and journalist. He succeeded to the title on the death of his father in 1904. His other titles included Earl of Donegall, Earl of Belfast, Viscount Chichester, and Baron Fisherwick, the last of which gave him a seat in the House of Lords. He was also the Hereditary Lord High Admiral of Lough Neagh.

Biography
The son of the elderly George Chichester, 5th Marquess of Donegall (1822–1904), Chichester was educated at the École nouvelle de la Suisse romande, Eton, and Christ Church, Oxford, and took up a career in journalism. For many years he wrote a column in the Sunday Dispatch under the title "Almost in Confidence". He made regular contributions to the Sunday News and Sunday Graphic, and also held a staff position on the Daily Sketch. As a journalist, he travelled extensively, notably covering the winter sports in St Moritz, Switzerland. He was a passenger on the maiden voyage of the Queen Mary, returning on the Hindenburg. In 1924, by virtue of his barony of Fisherwick in the peerage of Great Britain, he was able to take a seat in the House of Lords on reaching the age of twenty-one.

The Marquess of Donegall had a lifelong interest in aviation and owned his own aircraft, which he used for pursuing news stories. He covered the Spanish Civil War and was a distinguished war correspondent throughout the Second World War. His interest extended to cars and he was President of the Middlesex County Automobile Club from 1964 until his death in 1975. In 1949 he became a disc jockey with the BBC and in 1956 ran a Dixieland band and a jazz club in Kensington. He was also the owner of a record company.

He was a long-time member of the Sherlock Holmes Society of London, and edited its magazine, the Sherlock Holmes Journal, for many years. In that context and others, he told friends and acquaintances not to stand on ceremony ("My Lord") but not to use his first names either: "Call me Don!".

In 1943 he married Gladys Jean Combe, younger daughter of Captain Christian Combe. He parted from his wife after 10 years, and in 1962 moved to Switzerland. In 1968 the Marquess was granted a divorce under Swiss law and in that same year he married Mrs Maureen McKenzie, daughter of Major G C Schofield, MC, of Birkdale, Lancashire.
 
At the time of his death, the Marquess was working on his autobiography, which he planned to call Almost in Confidence, after the newspaper column he had run. It was not ready for publication before he died.

He died in Switzerland on 24 May 1975 at the age of 71. His second wife and widow died in 1999.

References

External links

 

1903 births
1975 deaths
Edward
People educated at Eton College
Alumni of Christ Church, Oxford
6
20th-century British journalists